The Norwalk River Railroad Bridge (also known as the Walk Bridge) is a swing bridge built in 1896 for the New York, New Haven and Hartford Railroad. It currently carries Amtrak and Metro-North Railroad trains over the Norwalk River.

The current swing bridge is located at the same site where, in 1853, a train from New York City plummeted into the river while the previous swing bridge was open, resulting in dozens of deaths. 

In 1896, the New Haven Railroad built the bridge and widened its route to four tracks, as it simultaneously built its South Norwalk Railroad Bridge over the intersection of Washington Street with North Main and South Main streets. The swing span has a rim-bearing system of 96 rollers, allowing tall vessels to pass by. The span is one of only 13 of the company's bridges (and one of only two railroad bridges) that survive in the state as of August 2001. In 1907 the rail line was electrified with overhead catenary wires, which form a prominent feature of the bridge today. It is or was also known as Norwalk River Bridge. It was added to the National Register of Historic Places in 1987.

It is one of eight moveable bridges on the Amtrak route through Connecticut surveyed in one multiple property study in 1986.  The eight bridges from west to east are:  Mianus River Railroad Bridge at Cos Cob, built in 1904; the Norwalk River Railroad Bridge at Norwalk, 1896; Saugatuck River Railroad Bridge at Westport, 1905; Pequonnock River Railroad Bridge at Bridgeport, 1902; Housatonic River Railroad Bridge, at Devon, 1905; Connecticut River Railroad Bridge, Old Saybrook-Old Lyme, 1907; Niantic River Bridge, East Lyme-Waterford, 1907; and Thames River Bridge (Amtrak), Groton, built in 1919.

As a single movable span with aging mechanical mechanisms, the Norwalk River Bridge represents a frequent point of failure for Amtrak and Metro-North service and has been targeted for replacement with dual movable spans. The final design approved for the new Walk Bridge calls for a dual-span vertical-lift bridge.

See also
National Register of Historic Places listings in Fairfield County, Connecticut
List of bridges on the National Register of Historic Places in Connecticut

References

External links

Walk Bridge Program - Connecticut Department of Transportation

Railroad bridges on the National Register of Historic Places in Connecticut
Bridges completed in 1896
Buildings and structures in Norwalk, Connecticut
Bridges in Fairfield County, Connecticut
Amtrak bridges
Railroad bridges in Connecticut
Swing bridges in the United States
New York, New Haven and Hartford Railroad bridges
Drawbridges on the National Register of Historic Places
National Register of Historic Places in Fairfield County, Connecticut